No 18, Fore Street, Taunton, Somerset, England, has a colourwashed Victorian front, to an earlier building. It has been designated as a Grade II* listed building for the interiors. The interior has enriched plaster ceilings and friezes, one of which is dated 1627.

Nearby, there is a 16th- or 17th-century arch leading to Bath Place. Also close is a Tudor Tavern dating to 1578.

See also

 Grade II* listed buildings in Taunton Deane

References

Grade II* listed buildings in Taunton Deane
Buildings and structures in Taunton